Vax or VAX is a computing instruction set architecture by DEC.

VAX or Vax may also refer to:

 VAX (band), a musical band co-founded by Alex P
 Vax (brand), Vax UK Ltd, a floorcare brand, including vacuum cleaners
 V Air, a low-cost carrier based in Taiwan, ICAO code VAX
 Vax'ildan "Vax" Vessar, a fictional half-elf rogue / paladin / druid in the D&D web series Critical Role
 Clipping of vaccine

See also

 VAX Unit of Performance or VUP, an obsolete measurement of computer performance
 VAXELN, a real-time operating system for the VAX architecture.
 Andrew Vachss (born 1942), American crime fiction author, child protection consultant, and attorney exclusively representing children and youths
 E*vax, American electronic music artist and half of New York based indie/electronic band Ratatat
 Anti-vax, a reluctance or refusal to be vaccinated
 
 Vacs
 Vaks
 VAC (disambiguation)
 Vack
 Vak (disambiguation)
 VAQ